Abulbəyli is a village and municipality in the Tovuz Rayon of Azerbaijan. It has a population of 5,653.

References

Populated places in Tovuz District